Isoetes toximontana, the Gifberg quillwort, is a plant species native to the Northern Cape and Western Cape regions of South Africa. It is known from only 3 sites. The type locality is on the slopes of Gifberg, a mountain forming part of the eastern boundary of the Olifants River Valley. The name "Gifberg" means "poison mountain"; this is in reference to a poisonous tree called "gifboom", Euphorbia virosa, that is endemic to the area. The specific epithet "toximontana" is a Latin translation of the Afrikaans name of the mountain.

Isoetes toximontana is an herb which grows in shallow water, very often emerging above the surface. Leaves are 3-10 per plant, up to 42 mm long, elliptical in cross-section. Mega- and microsporophylls may be found on the same plant. Megaspores number up to 36 per sporangium, gray-green, drying olive green, each up to 320 μm in diameter, covered with tubercules (bumps) over most of the surface. Microspores are brown, up to 25 μm in diameter.

References

toximontana
Flora of South Africa